Abdul Karim ( 1922 – December 22, 1973) was a widely published Bangladeshi soil scientist.

Education and career
Karim passed the matriculation examination in 1939 from Homna High School and Higher Secondary School Certificate examination in 1942 from Dhaka College. He obtained BS and MS degrees in chemistry from University of Dhaka in 1945 and 1946 respectively. He lectured in this field at the same university. A UNESCO fellowship enabled him to obtain a PhD in soil science at the University of Adelaide. After receiving a doctorate there in 1951 he returned to Dhaka University's newly formed Department of Soil Science, becoming department head in 1963.

He was the first head of the Agricultural Chemistry Department at the Bangladesh Agricultural University. He also served as Dean of the Faculty of Agriculture.

Karim worked in the fields of biogas technology, new sources for edible oils and new techniques for glass production.

Awards 
 President's Gold medal (posthumous) in 1980

References

Academic staff of the University of Dhaka
1920s births
1973 deaths
Bangladeshi soil scientists
University of Dhaka alumni
University of Adelaide alumni
Dhaka College alumni